La Digue is the third most populated island of the Seychelles, and fourth largest by land area, lying east of Praslin and west of Felicite Island. In size, it is the fourth-largest granitic island of Seychelles after Mahé, Praslin and Silhouette Island. It has a population of 2,800 people. Most of the inhabitants live in the west coast villages of La Passe (linked by ferry to Praslin and Mahé) and Anse Réunion. There is no airport on La Digue, so to get there from a foreign country, one must fly to Victoria and continue by ferry, usually via Praslin. It has an area of 10.08 km2, which makes it relatively easy to travel around by bike or on foot.

La Digue was named after a ship in the fleet of French explorer Marc-Joseph Marion du Fresne, who visited the Seychelles in 1768.

History
According to modern historians, La Digue was first sighted by the French navigator Lazare Picault in 1742, but it was not named until 1768. The first people settled on the island in 1789, when French colonists arrived with their African slaves. Most of them went back to France, but some people were left and some of today's inhabitants carry their names. Later, more French deportees arrived, followed by a large number of liberated slaves and Asian immigrants. In 1854, the first Catholic chapel was built on La Digue by Father Theophile. Most inhabitants of the island are of the Catholic faith. French colonists on La Digue manufactured coral lime, and they are believed to be responsible for the decline of the island's coral reefs. They also made copra out of coconuts, and they planted vanilla on their plantations. This tradition has been continued.

Climate
The Seychelles generally have warm temperatures throughout the year. They get frequent and sometimes heavy rainfall. On La Digue, rainfall can be very heavy, but it usually lasts for one hour or less. The month with the least precipitation is July, with only  of rain.

Culture
The inhabitants of La Digue are called Diguois. The first inhabitants arrived in 1798, exiled from Île Bourbon (now named Réunion) for taking part in a political rebellion there. They were supposed to be sent to the East Indies, but bribed the captain to ship them to Seychelles instead where many had relatives. The population of La Digue is mostly Catholic and the island's feast day on 15 August is a national holiday.

Politics
There is no separate government of La Digue, so it follows the laws and legislation set from the government in Victoria. The Seychelles have a president and the main political sides are the PP and SNP. The law system of the Seychelles is modelled on European legal systems.

Government services

Being an island with a population of only 2,800 people, there are few government buildings or services. For many services, people have to go to Praslin. La Digue has a post office which is closed on Sundays. There is a small police station that was mainly set up for tourists. There is a small hospital, although some inhabitants prefer to visit the hospitals in Praslin and Victoria. Women usually go to the hospital in Victoria to give birth.

Tourism

Today, the island's main industry is tourism, and it is known for its beaches, especially Anse Source d'Argent and Grand Anse. La Digue, along with the rest of the Seychelles, saw a major increase in tourism numbers in the late 20th century, which greatly impacted the economy of the Seychelles. Before 1960, copra and vanilla production were the mainstays of the local economy, which are commemorated in the island's museum.

The Veuve Nature Reserve, in the island's interior, is home to the rare black paradise flycatcher, of which there are only about 100 in existence. La Digue's wide variety of underwater creatures including fish, sharks and rays also attracts many tourists for diving trips. The island has plenty of accommodation and activities for tourists, including more than twenty guesthouses and hotels, restaurants and a dive centre. One can go on a boat trip or a diving trip around La Digue for a half day or a full day. Furthermore, the Veuve Reserve offers tourists hiking trips with guides.

Transport
The primary means of transportation is still the bicycle. It is possible to rent bicycles near the ferry pier. There are a few privately owned vehicles, but most cars and buses belong to hotel companies. Another method of transport on La Digue is the ox-cart, which has a slow pace suited to the island.

Cuisine
Since La Digue is an island inhabited by many ethnic groups, the local cuisine is a mix of world cuisines, with a specific focus on fish. With abundant seafood, the Seychellois people have developed hundreds of recipes using a variety of fish. One can have fish curry, fish fillets, raw fish with lemon, grilled fish, steamed fish, cooked fish and so on. The inhabitants of La Digue also make fried octopus, lobster with garlic and their biggest speciality – bat curry. A commonly used ingredient is ginger. The most popular alcoholic drink on La Digue is palm wine, which most Seychellois people like to make themselves by fermenting the inside of a coconut.

Wildlife

La Digue is the home to the critically endangered paradise flycatcher. However, there are more rare and endangered animals that live on this island. Since the Seychelles are detached from the rest of Africa, many of the species are endemic to La Digue. There is a significant population of giant tortoises that come from the island Aldabra. The subspecies that lived on La Digue is extinct. From the arthropod group there is, for example, the Seychelles coconut crab which likes to dig holes in the backyards of the Seychellois people. Among others, there are fodys, sunbirds, terns, fruitbats, sheath-tailed bats, and geckos.

The reefs and lagoons of La Digue offer a large amount of flora and fauna. Green sea turtles live on the very edges of the coral reefs, and they sometimes venture closer to the island. There are butterflyfish, eagle ray, moray eel and many other species of fish. Divers and snorkellers may be lucky enough to see blacktip reef sharks or even whale sharks, which come mainly in the winter but can be seen all year round.

Sadly, the animals that have traditionally lived on La Digue are threatened by animals that were brought there by the first inhabitants: rats, dogs, cats etc. The rat population was probably the first animal that was brought to the Seychelles. It quickly made many birds become extinct by eating their eggs and threatening their nests. The dog and cat population is not nearly as much of a threat, but it still is something that the original species of Seychelles are not used to.

Gallery

See also

 Cocos Island, Seychelles
 List of lighthouses in Seychelles

References

External links 

 Official La Digue Island Guide
 National Bureau of Statistics
 Map
 The Islands of the Seychelles

Somali Sea
Islands of La Digue and Inner Islands
Important Bird Areas of Seychelles
Lighthouses in Seychelles